Mela Mandi Ground is a multi-use historic stadium in Sargodha, Punjab, Pakistan.  It is currently used mostly for cricket and football. The Mela Mandi Ground was constructed to provide a vast ground for outdoor sports and activities. During March every year which is the country’s spring season, several competitions are held here. Almost all Pakistani people join these annual games.

See also
 Sargodha Cricket Stadium
 List of stadiums in Pakistan
 List of cricket grounds in Pakistan

References

External links 
 

Sargodha District
Cricket grounds in Pakistan
Football venues in Pakistan